PAN dating software is computer software to encourage conversation with others on a similar wireless network.

 Bawadu
 Bluedating
 BlackPeopleMeet
 Live Radar
 MobiLuck
 Nokia Sensor
 Proxy Dating

See also
 Lovegety
 Toothing

References

Sexuality and computing
PAN dating software